West Penwith Rural District was a rural district in Cornwall, England, United Kingdom, from 1894 to 1974. It was enlarged in 1934 by the abolition of Hayle, Ludgvan, Madron, Paul, and Phillack urban districts, and also took in part of the disbanded Redruth Rural District.

In 1974 it was abolished under the Local Government Act 1972, to form part of the new Penwith district.

From 1992 the name was used for the smallest Environmentally Sensitive Area (ESA) in England.

Civil parishes
The civil parishes within the district were:

 Gwinear–Gwithian
 Hayle
 Ludgvan
 Madron
 Marazion
 Morvah
 Paul
 Perranuthnoe
 Sancreed
 Sennen
 St Buryan
 St Erth
 St Hilary
 St Levan
 St Michael's Mount
 Towednack
 Zennor

See also

Penwith

References

Districts of England created by the Local Government Act 1894
Districts of England abolished by the Local Government Act 1972
Rural districts of England
Local government in Cornwall
History of Cornwall
Penwith